"Now I Know What Made Otis Blue" is a song performed by English singer Paul Young, released in 1993 as the lead single from his fifth studio album The Crossing. It was written by Mick Leeson and Peter Vale.

Reception and chart performance 
Aaron Badgley of AllMusic mentioned the song in a review about the album The Crossing saying that "'Now I Know What Made Otis Blue' is worth the price of the CD alone".

Of three songs released as a single from The Crossing, it was the highest charted single peaking at No. 14 on the UK Singles Chart and spending 7 weeks on the chart. It also charted on the German GfK Entertainment charts (No. 51), Dutch Single Top 100 (No. 36), Official New Zealand Music Chart (No. 38), and French Singles Chart (No. 16).

The music video was directed by Michael Geoghegan.

References 

1993 singles
Paul Young songs

1993 songs
Columbia Records singles